Yorkshire South West was a European Parliament constituency covering the southern parts of West Yorkshire in England and, at times, part of South Yorkshire.

Prior to its uniform adoption of proportional representation in 1999, the United Kingdom used first-past-the-post for the European elections in England, Scotland and Wales. The European Parliament constituencies used under that system were smaller than the later regional constituencies and only had one Member of the European Parliament each. The constituency of Yorkshire South West was one of them.

The area was later included in the Yorkshire and the Humber European Parliament Constituency, which was represented by seven members in 1999–2004 and six from 2004 onwards.

Boundaries
1979–1984: Colne Valley; Dewsbury; Hemsworth; Huddersfield East; Huddersfield West; Normanton; Pontefract and Castleford; Wakefield.

1984–1994: Barnsley West and Penistone; Colne Valley; Dewsbury; Hemsworth; Huddersfield; Normanton; Pontefract and Castleford; Wakefield.

1994–1999: Batley and Spen; Colne Valley; Dewsbury; Hemsworth; Huddersfield; Normanton; Pontefract and Castleford; Wakefield.

Members of the European Parliament

Results

References

External links
 David Boothroyd's United Kingdom Election Results

European Parliament constituencies in England (1979–1999)
Politics of West Yorkshire
History of West Yorkshire
Political history of Yorkshire
1979 establishments in England
1999 disestablishments in England
Constituencies established in 1979
Constituencies disestablished in 1999